The Durham University Rugby Football Club (Durham University RFC or DURFC) is the rugby union club of the University of Durham. They play in BUCS Super Rugby, the highest level student rugby competition in the UK, and have produced a number of notable international rugby players.

History
One of the earliest recorded matches was against Durham School, on 2 November 1875. The school won by "one goal, one try and two touch-downs to three touch-downs". Other fixtures for Michaelmas term 1875 included vs Houghton-le-Spring in Houghton on 6 November, vs Durham City in Durham on 13 November, vs South Shields in South Shields on 20 November, the return match vs Durham School in Durham on 25 November, vs Sunderland in Durham on 27 November, the return match vs Durham City on 2 December, vs Northumberland in Newcastle on 4 December, and the return match vs Houghton-le-Spring in Durham on 11 December.

Ted Wood previously served as director of rugby.

Durham were crowned BUCS Super Rugby champions for the 2019/20 season under captain Ben Fowles, the Covid-19 pandemic stopped the team from going to challenge for the BUCS Super Rugby Cup Final.

Following the cancelled Covid-19 season, Durham again won the BUCS Super Rugby league title for the 2021/22 season under captain Fred Davies.

Notable former players

Flags represent country capped by in international competition.
  Will Carling
  Will Greenwood
  Phil de Glanville
  Dave Walder
  Charlie Hodgson
  Tim Stimpson
  Duncan Hodge
  Jeremy Campbell-Lamerton
  Andy Mullins (rugby union)
  Marcus Rose
  Ben Woods
  Toby Allchurch
  Richard Breakey
  Tim Cowell
  Mark Griffin
  Charlie Hannaford
 Jon Ions
 Chris Kelly
  Peter Lillington
  Ed Kalman
  Ollie Phillips
  Peter Warfield
  Josh Beaumont
  Simon Hammersley

References

University and college rugby union clubs in England
Rugby union in County Durham
Rugby
Sport at Durham University